Arthroleptis brevipes is a species of frog in the family Arthroleptidae.
It is found in Togo and possibly Ghana.
Its natural habitats are subtropical or tropical moist lowland forests and heavily degraded former forest.

References

brevipes
Taxonomy articles created by Polbot
Amphibians described in 1924